Tokyo's 14th district is a single-member electoral district of the Japanese House of Representatives, the lower house of the national National Diet.

It has been held by Midori Matsushima from the Liberal Democratic Party since 2012.

Areas Covered

Current District 
As of 20 January 2023, the areas covered by this district are as follows:

 Sumida
 Edogawa 
 Chūō 4, Matsushima 1-4, Higashi Komatsugawa 1-4, Nishi Komatsugawa, Okinomiya, Kamiishiki 1-3, Honisshiki 1-3, within the jurisdiction of the central ward office
 Within the Komatsugawa and Koiwa offices

As part of the 2022 redistricting, the areas of Taitō were given back to the 2nd district, Arakawa was given to the new 29th district and the district gained parts of Edogawa from the 16th and 17th districts.

Areas from 2017-2022 
From the first redistricting in 2017 until the second redistricting in 2022, the areas covered by this district were as follows:

 Parts of Taitō 
 Higashi-Ueno 6, Shitaya 2 (13-1-5, 14-24, 14-15-24), Iriya 1 (1-3, 9-14, 21-28, 32 and 33) Iriya 2 1-33, Matsugaya 1-4, Nishi-Asakusa 2-3, Asakusa 2 (13-27), Asakusa 3-7, Senzoku 1, Senzoku 2 (1-32), Senzoku 3-4, Imado 1/2, Higashi-Asakusa 1/2, Hashiba 1/2 ,Kiyokawa 1/2 , Nihon Tsutsumi 1, Nihon Tsutsumi 2 (1-35)
 Sumida
 Arakawa

As part of the 2017 redistricting, parts of Taitō were transferred from the 2nd district.

Areas from before 2017 
From the creation of the district in 1994 and the first redistricting in 2017, the areas covered by this district were as follows:

 Sumida
 Arakawa

Elected Representatives

References

Links 

1994 establishments in Japan
Constituencies established in 1994
Districts of the House of Representatives (Japan)
Politics of Tokyo